Svätý Anton is a village in Banská Štiavnica District in the Banská Bystrica Region of central Slovakia. It is situated near the historic town of Banská Štiavnica. During the period of Communist Czechoslovakia, the village had to use the name Antol as a part of anti-religious campaigns. The first mention of Svätý Anton in written sources dates to 1266, when the village was owned by the Hont-Pázmány family of the Čabraď Castle. The last private owner was Ferdinand I of Bulgaria.

Landmarks

The manor house in Svätý Anton
The Svätý Anton manor house was originally built in baroque style as a two-wing building with arcades surrounding an open courtyard with a baroque stone fountain. In the middle of 18th century, Earl Andrej Kohary completed the process of re-building the manor house into a wealthy four-wing noble residence. The Kohary and Coburg families made an essential contribution in the history of the manor house.  Here, they concentrated beautiful pieces of artwork and crafts from various parts of the world (18th – 20th centuries). The manor house has served the purpose of a museum since 1962; currently it is a museum of art, history and hunting.

Park
A park that melts into a forest is part of the manor house estate. Currently, remnants of regular baroque type of treatment can be seen on the terraces near the main building. They loosely melt into landscape park and forested park. The preserved water system of the park is supplied with water from the Kolpassky brook through some kilometres long water gang with aqueducts. Until 1995, the meadow in front of the cage was dominated by an almost 120 years old Giant Sequoya (Sequoiadendron giganteum). Phillip Coburg planted it there in 1878 when his only son Leopold was born. In spite of many attempts to save it, the Sequoya dried.  A new and healthy tree was then planted at the entrance to the park in 1996.

Svätý Anton Pustovník church
The church was originally built in late baroque style in 1754 – 1755. In the middle of the 19th century it was rebuilt and got its current classicist aspect. The most valuable masterpieces housed in the church are a Madonna sculpture and a monumental panel painting signed by master M.S. dating from 1506.

Notable residents
 Béla Grünwald, Hungarian politician and historian
 Karol Zachar, artist

References

External links

Municipality of Svätý Anton
Museum in Svätý Anton
Information about Saint Hubert Days
Tourist information about Banská Štiavnica
Accommodation information for tourist region Štiavnické vrchy
 Múzeum vo Svätom Antone

Stiavnicke Bane